George Spencer-Brown (2 April 1923 – 25 August 2016) was an English polymath best known as the author of Laws of Form. He described himself as a "mathematician, consulting engineer, psychologist, educational consultant and practitioner, consulting psychotherapist, author, and poet".

Life
Born in Grimsby, Lincolnshire, England, Spencer-Brown attended Mill Hill School and then passed the First M.B. in 1940 at London Hospital Medical College (now part of Barts and The London School of Medicine and Dentistry). After serving in the Royal Navy (1943–47), he studied at Trinity College, Cambridge, earning Honours in Philosophy (1950) and Psychology (1951), and where he met Bertrand Russell. From 1952 to 1958, he taught philosophy at Christ Church, Oxford, took M.A. degrees in 1954 from both Oxford and Cambridge, and wrote his doctorate thesis Probability and Scientific Inference under the supervision of William Kneale which was released as a book in 1957.

During the 1960s, he became a disciple of the innovative Scottish psychiatrist R. D. Laing, frequently cited in Laws of Form. In 1964, on Bertrand Russell's recommendation, he became a lecturer in formal mathematics at the University of London. From 1969 onward, he was affiliated with the Department of Pure Mathematics and Mathematical Statistics at the University of Cambridge. In the 1970s and 1980s, he was visiting professor at the University of Western Australia, Stanford University, and at the University of Maryland, College Park.

During his time at Cambridge Spencer-Brown was a chess half-blue. He held two world records as a glider pilot, and was a sports correspondent to the Daily Express. He has also written some novels and poems, sometimes employing the pen name James Keys. Spencer-Brown died on 25 August 2016.

Laws of Form

Laws of Form, at once a work of mathematics and of philosophy, emerged from work in electronic engineering Spencer-Brown did around 1960, and from lectures on mathematical logic he later gave under the auspices of the University of London's extension program. First published in 1969, it has never been out of print. Spencer-Brown referred to the mathematical system of Laws of Form as the "primary algebra" and the "calculus of indications"; others have termed it "boundary algebra". The primary algebra is essentially an elegant minimalist notation for the two-element Boolean algebra, very similar to formal systems that Charles Sanders Peirce devised in work written in the 1880s and 1890s (see entitative graph and existential graph), but in some cases not published until after the first edition of Laws of Form.

Laws of Form has influenced, among others, Heinz von Foerster, Louis Kauffman, Niklas Luhmann, Humberto Maturana, Francisco Varela, Leon Conrad, and William Bricken. Some of these authors have modified and extended the primary algebra, with interesting consequences.

Controversial mathematics
In a 1976 letter to the Editor of Nature, Spencer-Brown claimed a proof of the four-color theorem, which is not computer-assisted. The preface of the 1979 edition of Laws of Form repeats that claim, and further states that the generally accepted computational proof by Appel, Haken, and Koch has 'failed' (page xii). Spencer-Brown's claimed proof of the four-color theorem has yet to find any defenders; Kauffman provides a detailed review of parts of that work.

Selected publications 
 1957. Probability and Scientific Inference.
 1961. Design with the Nor.
 1970. 23 degrees of Paradise.
 1971. Only Two can play this game.
Selected editions of Laws of Form:
 1969. London: Allen & Unwin.
 1972. Crown Publishers, hardcover. 
 1994. Cognizer Company, paperback. 
 1997. German translation titled Gesetze der Form. Lübeck: Bohmeier Verlag. 
"Claim of Proof to Four Colour Theorem." Letter to the Editor of Nature. 17 December 1976.

See also
Distinction (philosophy)

References

External links 

G Spencer-Brown: Laws of Form, website with Tutorial, Flash animations, downloads. Site not found
 Richard Shoup's website devoted to Spencer-Brown, his work, and related ideas. Includes an extensive bibliography of the secondary literature on Laws of Form.
 Brief bio of G. Spencer-Brown.
 Draw a distinction... The space of imagination based on Spencer-Brown.
 Kauffman, Louis H., "Reformulating the Map Color Theorem".
 Transcript of Spencer-Brown's talks at Esalen, 1973.
 http://iconicmath.com/
YouTube Course offering a close reading of Laws of Form by his last student, Leon Conrad.

1923 births
2016 deaths
20th-century  English mathematicians
People educated at Mill Hill School
Alumni of the London Hospital Medical College
Alumni of Trinity College, Cambridge
Fellows of Christ Church, Oxford
People from Grimsby
Royal Navy personnel of World War II